The Cohens and the Kellys in Africa is a comedy film. It is one of The Cohens and Kellys series.

References

External links
 

1930 films
1930 comedy films
Films directed by Vin Moore
American comedy films
Films set in Africa
Universal Pictures films
Africa
American black-and-white films
1930s American films